These are the most popular given names in the United States for all years of the 1960s.

1960 

Males
David
Michael
John
James
Robert
Mark
William
Richard
Thomas
Steven
Females
Mary
Susan
Maria
Karen
Lisa
Linda
Donna
Patricia
Debra
Deborah

1961 

Males
David
Michael
John
James
Robert
Mark
William
Richard
Thomas
Kenneth; Steven (tie)

Females
Mary
Lisa
Susan
Maria
Karen
Linda
Patricia
Donna
Sandra
Brenda

1962 

Males
Michael
John
David
Robert
James
Mark
William
Richard
Thomas
Jeffrey

Females
Lisa
Mary
Maria
Karen
Susan
Linda
Patricia
Donna
Cynthia
Debra

1963 

Males
David
John; Michael (tie)
 ——
James
Robert
Mark
Richard; William (tie)
 ——
Thomas
Kevin
Females
Lisa
Mary
Maria
Susan
Karen
Patricia
Linda
Donna
Sandra
Deborah

1964 

Males
Michael
John
David
Robert
James
Mark
William
Richard
Thomas
Joseph
Females
Lisa
Mary
Maria
Susan
Karen
Patricia
Donna
Linda
Kimberly
Elizabeth

1965 

Males
Michael
James
John
David
Robert
William
Richard
Mark
Thomas
Jeffrey
Females
Lisa
Maria
Karen
Mary
Kimberly
Susan
Patricia
Cynthia
Linda
Donna

1966 

Males
Michael 
David
John
James
Robert
William
Richard
Mark
Thomas
Jeffrey
Females
Lisa
Maria
Mary
Kimberly
Michelle
Patricia
Susan
Karen
Sandra
Deborah; Elizabeth (tie)

1967 

Males
Michael
David
James
John
Robert
William
Mark
Richard
Jeffrey
Christopher
Females
Lisa
Maria
Kimberly
Michelle
Mary
Karen
Susan
Angela
Melissa
Jennifer

1968 

Males
Michael
David
James
John
Robert
William
Mark
Christopher
Richard
Brian
Females
Lisa
Michelle
Kimberly
Maria
Jennifer
Melissa
Tammy
Angela
Mary
Susan

1969 

Males 
Michael
David
John
Robert
James
William
Richard
Christopher
Mark
Brian
Females
Lisa
Jennifer
Michelle
Kimberly
Maria
Melissa
Amy
Mary
Elizabeth
Karen

References 

 [http://www.ssa.gov/OACT/babynames/decades/names1960s.html

1960s
1960s in the United States